The Ashfield Independents are a political party in the Ashfield District in Nottinghamshire, England.

Electoral history 
In 2017, the Ashfield Independents stood candidates in the Nottinghamshire County Council elections. They won five seats.

A month later, Gail Turner ran for the party in the 2017 general election and gained 9.2% of the vote with 4,612 votes, receiving the second-highest vote share of an independent candidate in England; however, Labour retained the seat.

The party won two by-elections to Ashfield District Council in 2017 and 2018 in the Hucknall North and Sutton Junction & Harlow Wood wards.

In 2019 the party stood candidates across Ashfield District Council and won 30 of the 35 seats, taking overall control of the authority. The party also stood candidates in the neighbouring Broxtowe Borough Council, winning a single seat.  In addition the party won control of Annesley and Felley Parish Council.

In July 2019, party leader Jason Zadrozny announced that he would be a candidate for the Ashfield constituency when the next general election was held. The election came in December 2019 and Zadrozny came second with 27.6% of the vote.

In the 2021 local elections across the UK, the party won an increased 11 seats on Nottinghamshire County Council, winning every seat in the Ashfield District.

Elected councillors

Ashfield District Council 
There are currently 35 councillors in the Ashfield District Council, 26 of whom are members of the Ashfield Independents. Councillor Dave Hennigan was elected in 2019 as an Ashfield Independent, but was expelled in May 2020 after disagreements with the rest of the party.

Broxtowe Borough Council 
There is one councillor on Broxtowe Borough Council who is a member of the Ashfield Independents:

Nottinghamshire County Council 
There are 10 councillors on Nottinghamshire County Council who are members of the Ashfield Independents:

Westminster elections

See also 
 Ashfield District Council elections
 Ashfield (UK Parliament constituency)

References 

Locally based political parties in England
Ashfield District
Politics of Nottinghamshire